Zhai Chao (born December 14, 1971 in Beijing) is a Chinese handball player who competed in the 1996 and 2004 Summer Olympics, as well as in the 1999, 2001 and 2003 World championships. She was voted IHF World Player of the Year 2002.

Career
Chao Zhai started playing handball in Beijing in 1985. In the 1996 Olympics she finished fifth with the Chinese team. She played all four matches and scored 29 goals. She played for the Chinese national team at the 1999 World championship in Denmark/Norway. She started playing for the German club SV Berliner VG 49 in January 1998, and switched to the Danish club Randers HK in 2001. She played for the Chinese national team in the 2001 World Women's Handball Championship in Italy where she scored 49 goals and the 6th best scorer in the championship. She was a member of the Chinese team which finished eighth in the 2004 summer Olympics, where she played all seven matches and scored 32 goals. In 2004, she started playing for the Danish club Viborg HK, and with this club she won the EHF Champions League in 2006 and 2009.

Awards
Chao Zhai was voted World Handball Player of the Year 2002 by the International Handball Federation.

References

External links
Profile at Yahoo! Sports (archive)

1971 births
Living people
Chinese female handball players
Handball players at the 1996 Summer Olympics
Handball players at the 2004 Summer Olympics
Olympic handball players of China
Sportspeople from Beijing
Asian Games medalists in handball
Handball players at the 1990 Asian Games
Handball players at the 1994 Asian Games
Handball players at the 1998 Asian Games
Handball players at the 2002 Asian Games
Asian Games silver medalists for China
Asian Games bronze medalists for China
Medalists at the 1990 Asian Games
Medalists at the 1994 Asian Games
Medalists at the 2002 Asian Games